Eckart Altenmüller (born 19 December 1955) is a German physician and musician and one of the leading researchers in the field of neurophysiology and neuropsychology of musicians.

Life 
Born in Rottweil, Altenmüller studied medicine in Eberhard-Karls-Universität and Hôtel-Dieu in Paris from 1974 to 1981 and music at the Musikhochschule Freiburg from 1979 to 1985 (mainly flute). After receiving his doctorate in medicine from the Albert Ludwigs University in Freiburg, he also trained as a specialist in neurology.

Since 2005, Altenmüller has been a full member of the Göttingen Academy of Sciences and Humanities.

Awards 
 Scholarship of the Studienstiftung des deutschen Volkes.

Works

Books 
Schattauer, Stuttgart 2010, .
 Neurologische Erkrankungen bei Musikern. Springer 2002  .
 Vom Neandertal in die Philharmonie: Warum der Mensch ohne Musik nicht leben kann Springer 2018 .

CDs 
 Neurobiologie und -psychologie starker Emotionen – Lachen und Weinen in der Musik. Auditorium Netzwerk Müllheim

DVDs 
 Warum wir Musik lieben: Zur Neurobiologie der Sprache des Gefühls. Auditorium Verlag Müllheim

References

External links 
 Eckart Altenmüller auf der Website der Hochschule für Musik, Theater und Medien Hannover
 Interview with Eckart Altenmüller zu seiner Forschung

Neurophysiologists
German neurologists
20th-century German physicians
21st-century German physicians
Academic staff of the Hochschule für Musik, Theater und Medien Hannover
1955 births
Living people
People from Rottweil
Members of the Göttingen Academy of Sciences and Humanities